The 2022 Norwegian First Division (referred to as OBOS-ligaen for sponsorship reasons) is a Norwegian second-tier football league season.

The league started on 2 April 2022, and is scheduled to end on 29 October 2022, not including play-off matches.

Teams 

In the 2021 1. divisjon, HamKam, Aalesund, and Jerv were promoted to the 2022 Eliteserien, while Strømmen and Ull/Kisa were relegated to the 2022 2. divisjon.

Mjøndalen, Stabæk, and Brann were relegated from the 2021 Eliteserien, while Kongsvinger and Skeid were promoted from the 2021 2. divisjon.

Stadiums and locations

League table

Results

Play-offs

Promotion play-offs 

The teams from third to sixth place will take part in the promotion play-offs; these are single leg knockout matches. In the first round, the fifth-placed team will play at home against the sixth-placed team. The winner of the first round will meet the fourth-placed team on away ground in the second round. The winner of the second round will meet the third-placed team on away ground. The winner of the third round will face the 14th-placed team in the Eliteserien over two legs in the Eliteserien play-offs for a spot in the top-flight next season.

First round

Second round

Third round

Relegation play-offs 
The 14th-placed team took part in a two-legged play-off against the winners of the Second Division play-offs, to decide who would play in the First Division next season.

Skeid won 8–1 on aggregate.

Season statistics

Top scorers

Discipline

Player

Most yellow cards: 9
 Jakob Lindström (Fredrikstad)
 Ole Amund Sveen (Mjøndalen)
 Erik Tønne (Ranheim)

Most red cards: 2
 Nicolai Fremstad (Raufoss)
 Isaac Twum (Mjøndalen / Sogndal)
 Morten Strand (Stjørdals-Blink)
 Curtis Edwards (Stabæk)
 David Paulmin (Stjørdals-Blink)

References 

Norwegian First Division seasons
2
Norway
Norway